Chah Gabar (also Romanized as Chāh Gabār) is a village in Sharifabad Rural District, in the Central District of Sirjan County, Kerman Province, Iran. At the 2006 census, its population was 74, in 15 families.

References 

Populated places in Sirjan County